The Truce of Mitawa or Truce of Mitau, signed in November 1622 in Jelgava (Mitawa, Mitau), ended the Polish–Swedish War (1620–1622). 

The Polish–Lithuanian Commonwealth was forced to cede the Duchy of Livonia north of the Daugava River to the Kingdom of Sweden. It retained only a nominal control over the south-eastern territories near Riga, as well as the Duchy of Courland. The truce lasted till March 1625, when a new war wave of hostilities erupted in Lithuania. It was soon followed by the Polish–Swedish War (1625–1629).

See also
Polish–Swedish wars

Further reading
Sundberg, Ulf (2002)  Svenska krig 1521-1814  (Stockholm: Hjalmarson & Högberg)  

Jelgava
Mitawa
Swedish Livonia
Mitawa
Poland–Sweden relations
Treaties of the Polish–Lithuanian Commonwealth
Treaties of the Swedish Empire
1622 treaties
1622 in Europe
1622 in Sweden
1622 in the Polish–Lithuanian Commonwealth